The Scottish Fair Trade Forum is a Scottish charitable body that describes its mission as '...to gain Fair Trade Nation status for Scotland.' The Forum continues to promote the inclusion and use of Fair Trade products through involvement in helping individual towns, schools, councils  and public bodies  throughout the country achieve Fairtrade Status.

History

After the Labour and Liberal Democrat coalition government of the Scottish Parliament engaged in talks with the Welsh Assembly over each country's commitment to the Fair Trade Movement, the Scottish administration publicly committed to the Forum's creation on 27 January 2007. The Forum was officially launched by the Scottish Parliament on 27 October 2007. As Wales reached Fair Trade Nation status in 2008, the Fair Trade Forum aimed to make Scotland the second Fair Trade Nation in the world. This goal was achieved on 25 February 2013  and was celebrated at an event in Perth on 7 September 2013

See also

Fairtrade Town
Fairtrade Foundation

References

External links
Scottish Fair Trade Forum
Fairtrade Foundation

Fair trade organizations
Charities based in Edinburgh
Organizations established in 2007
Trade in Scotland
Business in Scotland
Foreign relations of Scotland
2007 establishments in Scotland